Mausoleum is a live album by the Danish band Myrkur, released through Relapse Records on 19 August 2016. It consists of acoustic and choral versions of Myrkur's music, which originally had been released as heavy metal songs.

Recording
Mausoleum is a live album with songs by the Danish heavy metal project Myrkur, rearranged for acoustic and choral performances. Most tracks are from Myrkur's debut album M (2015). One song, "Den lille piges død", was new. In addition to Myrkur's songs, there are two cover songs: Evert Taube's lullaby "" and Bathory's "Song to Hall Up High".

Reception
Politikens Pernille Jensen called Mausoleum magnificent and evocative and described it as "metal with an elf-like girls' choir" that gave her goosebumps. Mattias Kling of Aftonbladet wrote that Mausoleum sees Myrkur go as far as possible in infusing black metal with mystical, eerie and folkloric elements. He wrote that although the music is beautiful, and the performance creates inner images of what the live concert must have been like, the album gives the feeling of only being "half the experience". Christoffer Bertzell of Nöjesguiden said it is "hard to not be moved" by the "ominous and gloomy melodies" and recommended people to try to recreate the original concert setting by listening to the album "in a dark and cold cave". Metal Hammers Dom Lawson wrote that Mausoleum may not convince black metal purists, for whom Myrkur was controversial and regarded as "hipster-friendly", but Lawson called the album "startling, extreme in its own way and occasionally rather magical". AllMusic's Thom Jurek wrote that the stripped-down versions of the songs reveal both Myrkur's and the entire black metal genre's heritage from European folk music, and that the interplay between Bruun's piano and Jørgensen's guitar adds a classical element. He said the album should appeal to listeners who enjoy crossovers between classical music, dark wave and metal.

Track listing

Charts

References

2016 live albums
Myrkur albums
Relapse Records live albums